Makoto Saitō  is a Japanese graphic designer, self-described "poster designer", and artist.

Saitō was born in Fukuoka, Japan. His early work as a printmaker was successful, shown internationally, and is part of the collection of the Museum of Modern Art in New York. Saitō worked from 1974 to 1980 at Nippon Design Center before starting his own firm, Makoto Saitō Design. His posters are typified by text-free imagery in dense inks printed on thick, high quality papers. His wide-ranging creative activities explore perpetual theme of “seeing.” 

Saitō has been a member of the Alliance Graphique Internationale since 1994.

An interview with Saitō was featured in Spring 2000 issue of Eye magazine, and includes the following quote:

External links
 Makoto Saitō exhibition

Notes

1952 births
Japanese graphic designers
Living people